Orectogyrus is a genus of beetles in the family Gyrinidae, containing the following species:

 Orectogyrus albertianus Ochs, 1938
 Orectogyrus alluaudi Régimbart, 1889
 Orectogyrus angularis Régimbart, 1891
 Orectogyrus argenteovittatus Zimmermann, 1920
 Orectogyrus assimilis Régimbart, 1884
 Orectogyrus aureovittatus Brinck, 1956
 Orectogyrus aureus Ochs, 1934
 Orectogyrus baguenai Ochs, 1953
 Orectogyrus barrosmachadoi Brinck, 1951
 Orectogyrus basilewskyi Guignot, 1951
 Orectogyrus bedeli Régimbart, 1884
 Orectogyrus bicostatus (Boheman, 1848)
 Orectogyrus buettikoferi Régimbart, 1887
 Orectogyrus burgeoni Ochs, 1928
 Orectogyrus camerunensis Ochs, 1924
 Orectogyrus capicolus Brinck, 1955
 Orectogyrus centralis Ochs, 1938
 Orectogyrus coerulescens (Dejean, 1836)
 Orectogyrus collarti Ochs, 1937
 Orectogyrus conjugens Régimbart, 1892
 Orectogyrus constrictus Régimbart, 1907
 Orectogyrus convexus Ochs, 1934
 Orectogyrus coptogynus Régimbart, 1906
 Orectogyrus costatus (Aubé, 1838)
 Orectogyrus cuprifer Régimbart, 1884
 Orectogyrus curvipes Ochs, 1947
 Orectogyrus cyanicollis (Dejean, 1836)
 Orectogyrus cyanipterus Guignot, 1947
 Orectogyrus dahomeensis Régimbart, 1907
 Orectogyrus decorsei Régimbart, 1907
 Orectogyrus dedalus Guignot, 1952
 Orectogyrus demeryi Régimbart, 1891
 Orectogyrus dimidiatus (Laporte de Castelnau, 1835)
 Orectogyrus discors Régimbart, 1891
 Orectogyrus dorsiger Régimbart, 1884
 Orectogyrus dunkeli Ochs, 1934
 Orectogyrus elongatus Régimbart, 1886
 Orectogyrus endroedyi Ochs, 1967
 Orectogyrus erosus Régimbart, 1906
 Orectogyrus escherichi Ochs, 1924
 Orectogyrus eversor Brinck, 1956
 Orectogyrus familiaris Ochs, 1947
 Orectogyrus favareli Guignot, 1942
 Orectogyrus feminalis Régimbart, 1906
 Orectogyrus ferranti Ochs, 1928
 Orectogyrus fluviatilis Régimbart, 1907
 Orectogyrus formosus Ochs, 1928
 Orectogyrus furcatus Ochs, 1934
 Orectogyrus fusciventris Régimbart, 1895
 Orectogyrus gigas Ochs, 1934
 Orectogyrus glaucus Klug in Ehrenberg, 1834
 Orectogyrus grandis Régimbart, 1892
 Orectogyrus grisescens Fairmaire, 1899
 Orectogyrus guignoti Ochs, 1947
 Orectogyrus hancocki Ochs, 1934
 Orectogyrus hastatus Régimbart, 1892
 Orectogyrus hawashensis Omer-Cooper, 1930
 Orectogyrus heros Régimbart, 1884
 Orectogyrus imitans Ochs, 1928
 Orectogyrus interstitialis Ochs, 1938
 Orectogyrus jucundus Régimbart, 1892
 Orectogyrus kasikiensis Ochs, 1938
 Orectogyrus kaszabi Ochs, 1967
 Orectogyrus kelleni Régimbart, 1889
 Orectogyrus kutteri Ochs, 1967
 Orectogyrus lanceolatus Régimbart, 1884
 Orectogyrus laticostis Régimbart, 1906
 Orectogyrus latiusculus Ochs, 1938
 Orectogyrus leroyi Régimbart, 1886
 Orectogyrus lionotus Régimbart, 1884
 Orectogyrus longilabris Régimbart, 1895
 Orectogyrus longitaris Régimbart, 1884
 Orectogyrus luayensis Ochs, 1937
 Orectogyrus lujai Ochs, 1928
 Orectogyrus lunai Brinck, 1958
 Orectogyrus luteolus Ochs, 1938
 Orectogyrus madagascariensis (Dejean, 1836)
 Orectogyrus manensis Guignot, 1938
 Orectogyrus masculinus Régimbart, 1902
 Orectogyrus mesochlorus Guignot, 1952
 Orectogyrus milliaui Ochs, 1937
 Orectogyrus mirabilis Régimbart, 1884
 Orectogyrus mocquerysi Régimbart, 1892
 Orectogyrus monardi Guignot, 1941
 Orectogyrus nairobiensis Régimbart, 1907
 Orectogyrus nanus Ochs, 1934
 Orectogyrus neumanni Ochs, 1934
 Orectogyrus noctuabundus Brinck, 1951
 Orectogyrus oberthueri Régimbart, 1884
 Orectogyrus obscurus Ochs, 1947
 Orectogyrus ochsi Guignot, 1938
 Orectogyrus orectochilinus Ochs, 1925
 Orectogyrus orientalis Régimbart, 1907
 Orectogyrus ornaticollis Aubé, 1838
 Orectogyrus oscari Apetz, 1854
 Orectogyrus oscaris Régimbart, 1884
 Orectogyrus overlaeti Ochs, 1934
 Orectogyrus pallidiventris Ochs, 1934
 Orectogyrus pallidocinctus (Fairmaire, 1880)
 Orectogyrus pamelae Brinck, 1960
 Orectogyrus paradoxus Ochs, 1928
 Orectogyrus patromimus Ochs, 1929
 Orectogyrus peridines Guignot, 1955
 Orectogyrus perrieri Fairmaire, 1899
 Orectogyrus petrinus Brinck, 1960
 Orectogyrus pictimanus Régimbart, 1892
 Orectogyrus polli Régimbart, 1884
 Orectogyrus posticalis Ochs, 1930
 Orectogyrus potamophilus Guignot, 1955
 Orectogyrus probus Brinck, 1956
 Orectogyrus prolongatus Régimbart, 1892
 Orectogyrus pulcherrimus Zimmermann, 1916
 Orectogyrus purpureus Régimbart, 1892
 Orectogyrus rhodesianus Ochs, 1933
 Orectogyrus riggenbachi Ochs, 1934
 Orectogyrus robustus Ochs, 1925
 Orectogyrus rotundatus Ochs, 1934
 Orectogyrus rugulifer Régimbart, 1906
 Orectogyrus rugulosus Régimbart, 1907
 Orectogyrus rustibus Brinck, 1956
 Orectogyrus ruwenzoricus Alwarth, 1921
 Orectogyrus schistaceus (Gerstaecker, 1866)
 Orectogyrus schoenherri (Dejean, 1833)
 Orectogyrus schubotzi Alwarth, 1921
 Orectogyrus schultzei Zimmermann, 1920
 Orectogyrus semisericeus Gestro, 1881
 Orectogyrus semivillosus (Dejean, 1821)
 Orectogyrus sericeus (Klug in Ehrenberg, 1834)
 Orectogyrus sexualis Régimbart, 1891
 Orectogyrus simulans Ochs, 1928
 Orectogyrus sjoestedti Régimbart, 1902
 Orectogyrus socius Ochs, 1943
 Orectogyrus specularis (Dejean, 1833)
 Orectogyrus speculum (Aubé, 1838)
 Orectogyrus spinifer Franciscolo, 1986
 Orectogyrus strigicollis Guignot, 1952
 Orectogyrus subseriatus Régimbart, 1886
 Orectogyrus tavetensis Régimbart, 1906
 Orectogyrus trilobatus Régimbart, 1884
 Orectogyrus uellensis Ochs, 1928
 Orectogyrus vagus Guignot, 1938
 Orectogyrus vanstraeleni Ochs, 1938
 Orectogyrus vedyi Ochs, 1937
 Orectogyrus venustulus Ochs, 1933
 Orectogyrus vermiculatus Ochs, 1952
 Orectogyrus vestitus Régimbart, 1892
 Orectogyrus vicinus Régimbart, 1892
 Orectogyrus virescens Guignot, 1953
 Orectogyrus walterrossii Franciscolo & Sanfilippo, 1986
 Orectogyrus witteanus Ochs, 1938
 Orectogyrus zimmermanni Ochs, 1925

References

Gyrinidae
Adephaga genera